Octa Clark (April 30, 1904 in Judice, Louisiana – September 11, 1998 in Lafayette, Louisiana) was an American Cajun accordion player. Clark was a local Lafayette area musician and made three recordings of Cajun music.

Clark is buried in Maurice, Louisiana.

Discography
 Octa Clark Old Time Cajun Music (CD 9018 Arhoolie Records, 1981)
 Ensemble Encore (Rounder Select Records, January 1992)
 Cajun Spice: Dance Music from South Louisiana (CDROUN11550 Rounder Records, 1989)

See also
List of people related to Cajun music

References

Cajun accordionists
1904 births
1998 deaths
20th-century American musicians
20th-century accordionists